Notocallista is a genus of marine bivalve molluscs in the family Veneridae.

Distribution
This genus is endemic to southern Australia and New Zealand.

Species in the genus Notocallista
 Notocallista chione
 Notocallista kingii
 Notocallista multistriata (Sowerby, 1851)
 Notocallista virginea

References 
 Powell A. W. B., New Zealand Mollusca, William Collins Publishers Ltd, Auckland, New Zealand 1979 
 DiscoverLife

Veneridae
Bivalves of Australia
Bivalves of New Zealand
Bivalve genera